Shahnaz  is a street in Tabriz, Iran. The street is well-known because of its distinct architecture, the churches and shops. It is passing through few of Tabriz old suburbs including Baron Avak and Emamiye connecting them to the city center and Bazaar of Tabriz.

See also
 Tarbiyat street
 Ferdowsi Street

References 
  Editorial Board, East Azarbaijan Geography, Iranian Ministry of Education, 2000 (High School Text Book in Persian)
 http://www.eachto.ir

Streets in Tabriz